Yevhen Marusiak (born March 16, 2000) is an Ukrainian ski jumper. He holds the national record for the longest jump, which was established on 29th January 2023 on Kulm ski flying hill in Bad Mitterndorf, where he scored 210m in the qualifying round.

On 27 January 2023, he became first Ukrainian in history to surpass two-hundred meters (201.5 m).

On 12 February 2023, he became first Ukrainian in history who won the Continental Cup competition.

Career
Marusiak started his international career by representing Ukraine at the 2017 European Youth Olympic Winter Festival in Erzurum, Turkey. There he finished 21st in the HS109 competition. 

He also participated at three Junior World Championships between 2016 and 2019. His best personal finish was 49th in an HS100 competition in Râșnov in 2016.

Marusiak debuted at the World Championships in 2019.

Marusiak debuted at the Ski Jumping World Cup on February 13, 2021, in Polish Zakopane, where he was 49th on large hill. As of January 2022, his best World Cup results were 46th, both on February 14, 2021, in Polish Zakopane and on February 19, 2021, in Romanian Râșnov. As of January 2022, his best individual Continental Cup result was 38th on March 14, 2021, in Polish Zakopane.

In 2022, Marusiak was nominated for his first Winter Games in Beijing.

In 2023, at the ski flying event in Tauplitz, he got his first World Cup points in his career with 26th place.

Results

Olympic Games

Nordic World Championships

Ski Flying World Championships

World Cup

Standings

Individual starts (7)

References

External links
 

2000 births
Living people
Ukrainian male ski jumpers
Ski jumpers at the 2022 Winter Olympics
Olympic ski jumpers of Ukraine